is the second studio album by the Japanese girl group Momoiro Clover Z. It was released in Japan on April 10, 2013.

Release details 
On March 13, 2013, the album's lead song "Neo Stargate" was released on iTunes and Recochoku for digital download. On the same day, the video for the song was uploaded to the Stardust Promotion official YouTube channel.

The album was released in 3 versions: Regular Edition and Limited Editions A and B. The regular edition is CD-only, the limited edition A includes a CD with a live performance, and the limited edition B includes a DVD with 2 music videos.

5th Dimension was said by members to be a concept album that you should listen to in the track order.

The album sold 102,855 copies in its first day and debuted on top of the Oricon daily chart, with Momoiro Clover's first album Battle and Romance at number two.

Track listing

Charts

References

External links 
 Momoiro Clover Z's 2nd album "5th Dimension" official site
 Reviews
 Review: Momoiro Clover - 5th Dimension - Rolling Stone Japan

Momoiro Clover Z albums
2013 albums
King Records (Japan) albums